Ľ/ľ is a grapheme found officially in the Slovak alphabet and in some versions of the Ukrainian Latin alphabet. It is an L with a caron diacritical mark, more normally ˇ but simplified to look like an apostrophe with L, and is pronounced as palatal lateral approximant , similar to the "lj-" sound in Ljubljana or million.

Slovak
Examples include:
 podnikateľ: "businessman"; skladateľ: "composer"; bádateľ: "researcher"
 ľalia: "Lilium"; ľan: "linen"; ľuľkovec zlomocný: "Atropa belladonna"
 ľad: "ice"; ľadovec: "iceberg"
 Poľana, mountain range in Central Slovakia; Sečovská Poľanka, historical name for village Sečovská Polianka in Eastern Slovakia used from 1920 until 1948
 Ján Figeľ, Slovak politician who was European Commissioner for Education, Training and Culture from 2004 to 2009
 Jozef Ľupták, teacher who took part in the Slovak National Uprising and was killed in action on 27 October 1944

Note that an approximation using an ' apostrophe is sometimes found in some English texts, for example "L'udovit Stur" (sic) for correct Slovak Ľ-caron in Ľudovít Štúr. This incorrect usage is sometimes the result of an OCR error.

Ukrainian
⟨Ľ⟩ appears in some versions of the Ukrainian Latin Alphabet (Latynka), such as Jireček and Luchuk. It represents a palatalised ⟨l⟩, transcribed as /lʲ/. In other versions, it is written as ⟨lj⟩ or ⟨li⟩.

See also 
 ʎ
 љ
 lj

References

Latin letters with diacritics
Slovak language